

Belgium
 Congo Free State –  Théophile Wahis, Governor-General of the Congo Free State (1892–1908)

France
 French Somaliland – 
 Louis Ormiéres, acting Governor of French Somaliland (1901–1902)
 Adrien Jules Jean Bonhoure, Governor of French Somaliland (1902–1903)
 Guinea – Paul Jean François Cousturier, Lieutenant-Governor of Guinea (1900–1904)

Japan
 Taiwan – Kodama Gentarō, Governor-General of Taiwan (26 February 1898-April 1906)

Portugal
 Angola – Francisco Xavier Cabral de Oliveira Moncada, Governor-General of Angola (1900–1903)

United Kingdom
 Jamaica – Augustus William Lawson Hemming, Governor of Jamaica (1898–1904)
 Malta Colony – Francis Wallace Grenfell, Governor of Malta (1899–1903)
 North-Eastern Rhodesia – Robert Edward Codrington, Administrator of North-Eastern Rhodesia (1898–1907)
 Barotziland-North-Western Rhodesia – Robert Thorne Coryndon, Administrator of Barotziland-North-Western Rhodesia (1900–1907)

Colonial governors
Colonial governors
1902